The 2022–23 Welsh League Cup (known for sponsorship purposes as The Nathaniel MG Cup) was the 31st season of the Welsh League cup competition, which was established in 1992.  The reigning champions were Connah's Quay Nomads.

Format 

44 clubs  in the Cymru Premier, Cymru North and Cymru South leagues entered the season's League Cup.
Caersws and Denbigh Town were awarded the two wildcard spots for the current season.
2 teams from each of the Cymru North and Cymru South received byes into the second round - with those byes decided by being the first two clubs in each section of the competition to be drawn in the first round draw, These clubs joined the 12 clubs of the Cymru Premier plus the winners of the first round ties in the second round.

First round
The draw for the first round was made on 21 June 2022 with matches taking place on the weekend of 23 July. Colwyn Bay and Guilsfield of the Cymru North and Cwmbran Celtic and Ammanford in the Cymru South were drawn as the clubs receiving byes in to the second round

Northern

Southern

Second round
The draw for the second round took place on 25 July and was conducted by Cardiff City assistant manager Tom Ramasut. The 12 JD Cymru Premier clubs enter the competition at the second round stage and are joined by Barry Town United and Cefn Druids, who were relegated from the top-flight last season. The second round ties took place over the weekend of 6 August.

On 28 July 2022, Llandudno, Abergavenny Town and Briton Ferry Llansawel were removed from the Nathaniel MG Cup for rule breaches.  
 Cymru North side Llandudno beat Holyhead 2-1 in the first round, but have been removed after fielding two ineligible players.  
 Abergavenny and Briton Ferry have also been removed for rule breaches.
 Afan Lido will advance in place of Briton Ferry, but Abergavenny will not be replaced by Llanelli as they have also been thrown out for a rule breach.  Penybont received a bye to the third round.
 Llantwit Major, Mold Alexandra and Prestatyn Town were found proven of breaching the same rule, but those clubs were beaten in the first round.

Northern

Southern

Third round
The draw for the 2022/23 Nathaniel MG Cup third round took place at 8:15pm on Thursday 11 August and was conducted by Sgorio's Mike Davies. 
Flint Town United, despite losing in the previous round were reinstated due to a competition rule breach by Colwyn Bay.
The third round ties took place on 20 and 21 September.

Northern

Southern

Quarter-finals

Northern

Southern

Semi-finals

Final

Top scorers

References

Welsh League Cup seasons
2022–23 in Welsh football
Wales